Anna & Kristina's Beauty Call is a Canadian television series that airs on the W Network in Canada. Parts of the program are filmed in Vancouver, British Columbia, while some segments for the show are filmed in Los Angeles, New York, and Toronto. The show is produced by Worldwide Bag Media Inc. in association with W Network and produced by Picture Box Distribution. The credits give the impression that hosts Anna Wallner and Kristina Matisic are tip-toeing around a store, naked.

Hosts Anna Wallner and Kristina Matisic previously hosted and produced the two series The Shopping Bags and Anna & Kristina's Grocery Bag.

Targeting the 25-to-54 demographic, the show is slated for 26 episodes in its first season. Media planning was done by Toronto's Zig and executed through New York's Active Media. The show's premiere offers tips on eyebrow grooming, how to best fit a stiletto, and wearing the right accessories for your body type.

Concept
By employing various product-testing methods, Anna and Kristina put clothing, trends and beauty products and techniques to the test. This is also accomplished with the help of high-profile fashion and beauty industry guest experts including Carolina Herrera and Yigal Azrouel. The first episode aired on Tuesday, November 10, 2009 at 9 p.m.

The goal of each episode is to re-style men and women facing fashion dilemmas, working with a $500 budget. In addition to the limited budget, the two have just a few hours to put the look together. The $500 budget was partly influenced by today's challenging economic times and the fact that few people have limitless funds for clothes. The final outfit, and how it suits the person they have made over, is then offered up for appraisal by an expert from the fashion world. The judges include Kim Newport-Mimran of Pink Tartan, Flare editor-in-chief Lisa Tant, and Brian Hill, president and CEO of Aritzia.

The show also includes product reviews, how-to's, and tips for both budget- and style-conscious consumers.

Segments
During each 30-minute episode, there are a variety of rotating segments in addition to the main makeover segment. Said segments include:

Anatomy of, which takes a look at the key details that go into making a quality piece of clothing
Beauty and the Best, where Anna and Kristina work with other testers to test the quality of beauty products
Copy Cats, a look at expensive items and examples of good imitations that are cost efficient
Uncut, where Anna & Kristina look at various non-invasive beauty treatments, including intense pulsed light therapy, lipolaser therapy, and infrared saunas.

List of episodes

See also
The Shopping Bags
Anna & Kristina's Grocery Bag

References

External links
 Anna & Kristina's official website
 Kristina Matisic's bio on Anna & Kristina's official website
 Anna Wallner's bio on Anna & Kristina's official website
 TV show fan page for Anna & Kristina's Beauty Call on Facebook
 Anna & Kristina's photostream on Flickr
 Anna & Kristina's tweets on Twitter
 Anna & Kristina's videos on YouTube
 Worldwide Bag Media Inc. corporate information
 Picture Box Distribution contact information for the series Anna & Kristina's Beauty Call

2000s Canadian reality television series
2010s Canadian reality television series
2009 Canadian television series debuts
2010 Canadian television series endings
Television shows filmed in Vancouver
W Network original programming